Roy Williams Airport  is a privately owned public-use airport located three nautical miles (6 km) northeast of the central business district of Joshua Tree, in San Bernardino County, California, United States.

The airport was named for Roy Williams, artist and entertainer for The Walt Disney Studios, best known as "Big Roy", the adult mouseketeer on The Mickey Mouse Club. Williams was also a pilot and the father-in-law of airport owner Park Richardson.

The Roy Williams Airport has been closed by the family of Park Richardson. Although difficult to see from the air, the paved runway has Xs painted.

Facilities and aircraft 

It has two runways: 6/24 is 2,493 by 50 feet (760 x 15 m) with an asphalt surface; 12/30 is 2,355 by 100 feet (718 x 30 m) with an asphalt and dirt surface.

For the 12-month period ending August 17, 2007, the airport had 6,200 general aviation aircraft operations, an average of 16 per day. At that time there were 14 aircraft based at this airport: 79% single-engine and 21% ultralight.

References

External links 

 Roy Williams Airport
 Aerial image as of 3 October 1995 from USGS The National Map

Airports in San Bernardino County, California